Christian Nkamgang (born 27 October 1965) is a Cameroonian judoka. He competed in the men's extra-lightweight event at the 1984 Summer Olympics.

References

1965 births
Living people
Cameroonian male judoka
Olympic judoka of Cameroon
Judoka at the 1984 Summer Olympics
Place of birth missing (living people)
20th-century Cameroonian people